Jäckvik (pronounced )  or Jäkkvik is a mountain hamlet in Arjeplog municipality on Swedish national road 95 (Silver Road).  It is located near Pieljekaise National Park and about 20 km south of the Arctic Circle. Jäckvik has a lodge and a ski run.

The Swedish priest Lars Levi Læstadius was born in Jäckvik.

Populated places in Arjeplog Municipality
Lapland (Sweden)